Tudor Ulianovschi (born 25 May 1983) is a Moldovan politician and diplomat who was Foreign Minister of Moldova between January 2018 and June 2019. Prior to that, he served as the Moldovan Ambassador to Liechtenstein and Switzerland.

Educational background 
Ulianovschi’s academic background is in International Public and Trade Law, at the Free International University of Moldova (an LL.M. degree and a PhD candidate), the Diplomatic Academy of Vienna and the Diplomatic Institute of Bucharest.

Diplomatic career 
Between 2016-2018, he was the Moldovan top diplomat in Geneva, serving as Ambassador to Switzerland and Liechtenstein, as well as the Permanent Representative to the United Nations Office in Geneva and Permanent Representative to the World Trade Organization. During his mandate in Geneva, Ulianovschi served on and chaired various committees, including the Balance of Payments Committee of the WTO, the Trade and Development Board at UNCTAD the General Assembly at WIPO, and the Steering Committee on Trade at UNECE. He also has served at the Embassies of the Republic of Moldova in Washington, DC (2007-2010) and Doha (2013-2014), before becoming the Deputy Foreign Minister.

Foreign minister 
As Moldova’s Foreign Minister, Ulianovschi promoted government decisions to open new diplomatic missions in Africa, Latin America, India and Europe, During his mandate, Moldova ratified and implemented the WTO Trade Facilitation Agreement and became a member of the WTO Government Procurement Agreement. He represented Moldova at the World Economic Forum in Davos in 2019. One of his major diplomatic breakthroughs achieved during his tenure was the adoption of United Nations General Assembly resolution (document A/72/L.58) in June 2018 which called on the Operational Group of Russian Forces to be withdrawn from Moldovan territory.

Personal life 
He is currently married to Corina Cojocaru and has a child. Besides his native Romanian language, he is fluent in English, Russian, French and Arabic. He was a legal advisor to various non-governmental organizations in the field of human and patient rights.

References

Living people
Moldovan diplomats
Foreign ministers of Moldova
1983 births
Ambassadors of Moldova
Ambassadors to Liechtenstein
Ambassadors to Switzerland